Mahu Kalan is a census town in Sawai Madhopur district in the Indian state of Rajasthan.

Demographics
 India census, Mahu Kalan had a population of 8542. Males constitute 52% of the population and females 48%. Mahu Kalan has an average literacy rate of 60%, higher than the national average of 59.5%: male literacy is 74%, and female literacy is 45%. In Mahu Kalan, 17% of the population is under 6 years of age.

References

Cities and towns in Sawai Madhopur district